NGC 5010 is a lenticular galaxy located about 140 million light years away in the constellation Virgo. It was discovered by John Herschel on May 9, 1831. It is considered a Luminous Infrared Galaxy (LIRG). As the galaxy has few young blue stars and mostly red old stars and dust, it is transitioning from being a spiral galaxy to being an elliptical galaxy, with its spiral arms having burned out and become dusty arms. From the perspective of Earth, the galaxy is facing nearly edge-on.

See also
 NGC 4261 – a similar elliptical galaxy

References

External links

Virgo (constellation)

Lenticular galaxies
Peculiar galaxies
Luminous infrared galaxies

5010
45868